The Gomoa Onyaadze Solar Power Station is an operational grid-connected  solar power plant, in Ghana. The privately owned power station sells its power to the Power Distribution Services Ghana (PDSG), formerly Electricity Company of Ghana (ECG), under a long-term power purchase agreement.

Location
The power station is located in Gomoa West District, in the Central Region of Ghana, south of the settlement of Otaw, Ghana, on the road between Otaw and Mankwadze, Ghana, on the Atlantic coast. The geographical coordinates of Gomoa Onyaadze Solar Power Station are 05°20'46.0"N, 0°42'12.0"W (Latitude:5.346111; Longitude:-0.703333). This power station is in close proximity with BXC Solar Power Station (Onyandze Solar Power Station), established in 2016.

Overview
The power station uses a total of 64,400 solar photo voltaic (PV) modules which, when struck by sunlight, generate direct current (DC) electricity. Using 400 inverters, the DC is converted to alternating current (AC), which is fed into the national electricity grid, via a high voltage transmission line from the power station to the PDSG substation in Winneba.

Developers
The solar farm was developed, financed and is owned and operated  by Meinergy Ghana Limited, a Ghanaian independent power producer (IPP).

Costs, funding and timeline
The construction costs for this power station is reported as $30 million by one source. Another reliable source reported the cost at €23 million. All the financing was incurred by the owner/developers. The power station was commercially commissioned on 16 September 2018.

See also

List of power stations in Ghana
Electricity sector in Ghana

References

External links
President Commissions 20MW Gomoa Onyaadze Solar power plant As of 16 September 2018.

Solar power stations in Ghana
Central Region (Ghana)
Energy infrastructure completed in 2018
2018 establishments in Ghana